Nuredin Rexhep Voka (1847 - 1917) was an Albanian alim, mufti, writer and a prominent activist of the Albanian National Awakening.

Biography
Rexhep Voka was born in 1847 in the village of Şipkovica, Tetovo. In 1868, Voka undertook religious studies in Istanbul where he worked as a professor after completing his education. Voka returned to Kalkandelen in 1895 where he became involved in the Albanian National Renaissance. In 1903, Voka was appointed Mufti of the Manastir Vilayet and founded the first Albanian theological college in Üsküb (today Skopje). In Monastir, before the Young Turk revolution, Voka started learning Albanian in Latin characters from Albanian Protestant missionaries. In 1905, Voka attended the Pan-Albanian Congress organized in Bucharest. Headed by Albert Ghica, attended by Ismail Qemali and deliberated with Bucharest's Albanian community, the congress discussed the Albanian issue.

Rexhep Voka was a member of Bashkimi (Unity) at the time of the Young Turk revolution. He printed an Albanian alphabet in Arabic script comprising forty-four letters, called Elifbaja shqip. Tiranli Fazli then used this script to publish a thirty-two page grammar. Only one Albanian newspaper at the time ever appeared in Arabic script, and it lasted a brief period. Regardless of what script appeared, such material raised Albanian national consciousness.

References

People from Tetovo Municipality
People from Kosovo vilayet
Activists of the Albanian National Awakening
Albanians in North Macedonia